Hustlan.A.I.R.E. is a studio album released by Messy Marv on July 18, 2006.  Guest appearances on the album include Birdman, Keak Da Sneak, Lucci, The Click Clack Gang, E-40, B-Legit & Noble.

Track listing
 "I'm Shinin'"
 "Real Life"
 "Ain't No Cut On Me" (featuring Birdman)
 "Pop That Nigga"
 "My Potna"
 "Stuntin'"
 "Thug Life"
 "Dangerous" (featuring Keak Da Sneak) 
 "Crazy" (featuring Lucci)
 "Make Room"
 "Where I'm Bout 2 Go"
 "So Hot" (featuring The Click Clack Gang)
 "C Of A" (featuring E-40 & B-Legit)
 "Street Law" (featuring Noble)

Messy Marv albums
2006 albums